Adolf Spinnler (July 18, 1879 – November 20, 1951) was a Swiss gymnast who competed in the 1904 Summer Olympics.

References

External links
 
 

1879 births
1951 deaths
Gymnasts at the 1904 Summer Olympics
Olympic gold medalists for Switzerland
Olympic bronze medalists for Switzerland
Olympic medalists in gymnastics
Medalists at the 1904 Summer Olympics
People from Liestal
Sportspeople from Basel-Landschaft